A workaholic is someone suffering a from a psychological disorder.
Workaholic, or variants, may also refer to:
Workaholics, a 2011 television comedy series on Comedy Central
Workaholic (song), song by 2 Unlimited